This is a list of massacres and mass murders that have occurred in Australia and its predecessor colonies (some historical numbers may be approximate). Many of the massacres not listed here may instead be found in the list of massacres of Indigenous Australians. A mass murder involves the murder of four or more people during the same incident.

Massacres and mass murders

Attacks causing multiple non-fatal injuries
Mass violent attacks which caused many injuries but few deaths.

Sydneicy Yugoslav General Trade and Tourist Agency bombing – in 1972, 16 people were wounded by a bomb planted at Yugoslav tourism agencies. Nobody was killed.
Sydney Hilton Hotel bombing – in 1978, a bomb exploded outside the Hilton Hotel in Sydney, injuring 11 people and killing 3.
Russell Street bombing – in 1986, 23 people were wounded when a car bomb ignited outside a Police Building. One of the wounded, a female police officer, died later of injuries from the explosion.
December 2017 Melbourne car attack – in December 2017, a man drove a car into pedestrians, injuring 18 people (including himself) and killing 1. Should not be confused with the January 2017 Melbourne car attack.
2010 Darwin shopping centre bombing - a shopping trolley loaded with petrol cans and fireworks was detonated in a shopping center, injuring 19 people.
Monash University shooting - a mass shooting which resulted in 2 deaths and 5 injuries.

Murders over an extended period of time

See also
Indigenous massacres and conflicts:
List of massacres of Indigenous Australians
Australian frontier wars
Terrorism:
Terrorism in Australia
List of terrorist incidents in Australia
Crime:
Crime in Australia
List of Australian criminals
Timeline of major crimes in Australia

References

Australia
Massacres

massacres
Australian crime-related lists